Aphyle onorei is a moth of the family Erebidae. It is found in Ecuador.

References

Moths described in 1988
Phaegopterina
Moths of South America